"She's My Kind of Crazy" is a song recorded by Canadian country music group Emerson Drive. It was released in July 2012 as the first single from their album Roll. The song reached the top forty on the Canadian Hot 100.

Music video
The music video was directed by David Pichette and premiered in July 2012.

Chart performance
"She's My Kind of Crazy" peaked at number 37 on the Canadian Hot 100 for the week of August 18, 2012.

Certifications

References

2012 singles
2012 songs
Emerson Drive songs
Open Road Recordings singles
Songs written by Bobby Pinson